Zoran Dragić (born June 22, 1989) is a Slovenian professional basketball player who plays for Cedevita Olimpija of the Slovenian League and the ABA League. He also represents the Slovenian national basketball team internationally. He is the younger brother of Goran Dragić.

Professional career

Early years
In 2004, Dragić joined Ilirija of the Slovenian 1B league for the 2004–05 season. A year afterwards, he joined Janče STZ of the Slovenian D2 league for the 2005–06 season. During 2006, he signed with Geoplin Slovan of the Slovenian League where he went on to play four seasons for them. In 2010, he signed with Krka where he went on to play two seasons for them.

Málaga (2012–2014) 
In July 2012, Dragić joined the Houston Rockets for the 2012 NBA Summer League. On August 20, 2012, he signed a two-year deal with Unicaja Málaga of the Liga ACB. On July 8, 2014, he signed a two-year contract extension with Unicaja Málaga. However, after agreeing to sign with the Phoenix Suns, Dragić and Málaga agreed to part ways on September 26, 2014.

Phoenix Suns (2014–2015) 
On September 29, 2014, Dragić signed a two-year deal with the Phoenix Suns. He went on to make his NBA debut on November 15, 2014, against the Los Angeles Clippers. He and Goran, alongside teammates Markieff and Marcus Morris, all briefly played together for the Suns during the fourth quarter of their 112–96 victory over the Philadelphia 76ers on January 2, 2015. It marked the first time in the NBA's history that two different pairs of brothers played together for the same team at the same time. In what was just his third game of the season, he also recorded his first NBA stats with 3 points, 1 rebound, and 1 assist.

Miami Heat (2015)
On February 19, 2015, Zoran and his brother Goran were traded to the Miami Heat in a three-team deal also involving the New Orleans Pelicans. On March 4, he was assigned to the Sioux Falls Skyforce of the NBA Development League. On March 15, he was recalled by Miami. In the Heat's season finale against the Philadelphia 76ers on April 15, Dragić scored a season-high 22 points. In July 2015, he joined the Heat for the 2015 NBA Summer League. On July 27, Dragić was traded to the Boston Celtics, along with a 2020 second round pick and cash considerations, in exchange for a 2019 second round pick. However, on August 10, he was waived by the Celtics.

Return to Europe
On August 13, 2015, Dragić signed a two-year deal with the Russian club Khimki. After one season he left Khimki, and on July 7, 2016, he signed with Italian club Olimpia Milano. He was released from Milano on November 20, 2017. The next day, he signed with Turkish club Anadolu Efes.

His season ended prematurely on February 20, 2018, when he suffered a torn anterior cruciate ligament. Dragić nursed and recovered from his injury and returned in January 2019.

He signed with Serie A club Alma Trieste on January 8, 2019, until the end of the 2018-2019 season.

On August 6, 2019, he signed with ratiopharm Ulm of the German Basketball Bundesliga (BBL).

On January 30, 2020, Dragić officially signed with Liga ACB club Baskonia for the rest of the season, making his return to the EuroLeague. He signed a contract extension with the team on August 5.

On October 30, 2021, Dragić signed with Žalgiris Kaunas of the Lithuanian Basketball League, for the remainder of the season. He parted ways with the team on December 31.

On January 9, 2022, Dragić signed with Cedevita Olimpija of the Slovenian League and the ABA League.

National team career
Dragić started playing for the Slovenian national junior team in the 2007 FIBA Europe Under-18 Championship. He also participated in the 2009 FIBA Europe Under-20 Championship, during which he would be the tournament's 4th best scorer, throughout the entire competition.

In 2011, Dragić participated with the Slovenian senior squad, alongside his brother, Goran, during the EuroBasket 2011 tournament. After the success he had in 2011, he also played for Slovenia in the EuroBasket 2013 tournament, and helped the team finish with a better place in the final standings than the previous tournament. He went on to play for Slovenia in the 2014 FIBA Basketball World Cup, where his performance became a leading catalyst for his eventual signing with the Phoenix Suns later that year.

He represented Slovenia at the EuroBasket 2015, where they were eliminated by Latvia in the round of 16. After an absence at the 2017 tournament, Dragić was on the roster for EuroBasket 2022 where Slovenia was eliminated in the quarter-finals by Poland.

Career statistics

NBA

Regular season

|-
| style="text-align:left;"| 
| style="text-align:left;"| Phoenix
| 6 || 0 || 2.2 || .250 || .000 || .667 || .5 || .2 || .0 || .0 || 1.0
|-
| style="text-align:left;"| 
| style="text-align:left;"| Miami
| 10 || 1 || 6.2 || .409 || .333 || .500 || .5 || .4 || .2 || .0 || 2.2
|- class="sortbottom"
| style="text-align:left;"| Career
| style="text-align:left;"|
| 16 || 1 || 4.7 || .367 || .214 || .600 || .5 || .3 || .1 || .0 || 1.8

EuroLeague

|-
| style="text-align:left;"| 2012–13
| style="text-align:left;" rowspan=2| Unicaja
| 22 || 13 || 16.3 || .398 || .129 || .741 || 3.0 || .5 || .7|| .0 || 4.5 || 4.5
|-
| style="text-align:left;"| 2013–14
| 22 || 19 || 22.9 || .413 || .354 || .703 || 2.7 || 1.6 || .7 || .1 || 10.9 || 10.0|-
| style="text-align:left;"| 2015–16
| style="text-align:left;"| Khimki
| 24 || 5 || 16.4 || .490 || .338 || .662 || 2.5 || .8 || .8 || .0 || 8.0 || 7.6
|-
| style="text-align:left;"| 2016–17
| style="text-align:left;"| Milano
| 23 || 14 || 19.1 || .445 || .296 || .726 || 2.2 || .7 || .7 || .2 || 7.0 || 4.8
|-
| style="text-align:left;"| 2017–18
| style="text-align:left;"| Anadolu Efes
| 14 || 10 || 28.1 || .429 || .304 || .853 || 2.1 || 2.7 || .8 || .1 || 10.6 || 9.6
|-
| style="text-align:left;"| 2019–20
| style="text-align:left;" rowspan=2| Baskonia
| 5 || 1 || 17.3 || .367 || .357 || .706 || 2.0 || .4 || .6 || .0 || 7.8 || 6.0
|-
| style="text-align:left;"| 2020–21
| 33''' || 3 || 17.9 || .421 || .284 || .787 || 1.6 || .9 || .6 || .0 || 8.5 || 6.8
|-
| style="text-align:left;"| 2021–22
| style="text-align:left;"| Žalgiris
| 9 || 5 || 13.1 || .293 || .250 || .700 || 1.2 || .6 || .4 || .1 || 3.9 || 2.1
|- class="sortbottom"
| style="text-align:center;" colspan=2| Career
| 152 || 70 || 19.0 || .425 || .300 || .737 || 2.2 || 1.0 || .7 || .1 || 7.9 || 6.7

Personal life
His father is of Serbian descent. Dragić's older brother, Goran, currently plays for the Milwaukee Bucks; the two brothers were teammates on both the Suns and Heat during the 2014–15 season. During an interview with Goran in 2014, it was revealed that Zoran was also married.

References

External links

 
 Zoran Dragić at draftexpress.com
 Zoran Dragić at eurobasket.com
 Zoran Dragić at euroleague.net
 Zoran Dragić at fiba.com
 Zoran Dragić at legabasket.it 
 
 

1989 births
Living people
2014 FIBA Basketball World Cup players
ABA League players
Anadolu Efes S.K. players
Baloncesto Málaga players
Basketball players at the 2020 Summer Olympics
BC Khimki players
BC Žalgiris players
KD Ilirija players
KD Slovan players
KK Cedevita Olimpija players
KK Krka players
Lega Basket Serie A players
Liga ACB players
Miami Heat players
National Basketball Association players from Slovenia
Olimpia Milano players
Olympic basketball players of Slovenia
Pallacanestro Trieste players
Phoenix Suns players
Ratiopharm Ulm players
Shooting guards
Sioux Falls Skyforce players
Slovenian expatriate basketball people in Germany
Slovenian expatriate basketball people in Italy
Slovenian expatriate basketball people in Lithuania
Slovenian expatriate basketball people in Russia
Slovenian expatriate basketball people in Spain
Slovenian expatriate basketball people in the United States
Slovenian men's basketball players
Slovenian people of Serbian descent
Small forwards
Basketball players from Ljubljana
Undrafted National Basketball Association players